Dolynska is a city in Kropyvnytskyi Raion, Kirovohrad Oblast (region) of Ukraine. It hosts the administration of Dolynska urban hromada, one of the hromadas of Ukraine. Population: .

Until 18 July 2020, Dolynska was the administrative center of Dolynska Raion. The raion was abolished in July 2020 as part of the administrative reform of Ukraine, which reduced the number of raions of Kirovohrad Oblast to four. The area of Dolynska Raion was merged into Kropyvnytskyi Raion.

References

Cities in Kirovohrad Oblast
Mining cities and regions in Ukraine
Cities of district significance in Ukraine
Kherson Governorate